Val Fex (Romansh) is a southern side valley from the Upper Engadine in Switzerland, located at an altitude of around  above sea level. It belongs to the municipality of Sils im Engadin/Segl.

There are a few small hamlets in the valley, such as Fex Platta, Fex Crasta, Vaüglia at its entrance, and Muot and Curtins on the half way. At the very end one finds the Alp Muot Selvas at the former (about 150 years ago) foot of the glaciers.

The river Fedacla runs through the valley, starting at the feet of the three glaciers roughly from south to the north and enters the Lej da Silvaplauna in the Upper Engadine. The valley is dominated by several high Alpine mountains, Piz Corvatsch to the east side of the valley, Il Chapütschin in the far back of the valley, La Muongia and Piz Tremoggia above the glacier Vadret del Tremoggia, Piz Fora above the glacier Vadret da Fex, and Piz Güz and Piz Led above the third glacier Vadret dal Güz.

The valley is car-free, except for those belonging to residents. There are two small guest houses / hotels in the valley. A popular local attraction is a tour of the valley by horse sleigh out of Sils, during both summer and winter.

Valleys of the Alps
Engadin
Sils im Engadin/Segl